United States women's junior national softball team is the junior national under-17 team for United States.  The team competed at the 1985 ISF Junior Women's World Championship in Fargo, North Dakota where they finished third.  The team competed at the 1987 ISF Junior Women's World Championship in Oklahoma City, Oklahoma where they finished first. The team competed at the 1991 ISF Junior Women's World Championship in Adelaide, Australia where they had 11 wins and 2 losses. The team competed at the 1995 ISF Junior Women's World Championship in Normal, Illinois where they finished first.  The team competed at the 1999 ISF Junior Women's World Championship in Taipei, Taiwan where they finished second.  The team competed at the 2003 ISF Junior Women's World Championship in Nanjing, China where they finished second.  The team competed at the 2007 ISF Junior Women's World Championship in Enschede, the Netherlands where they finished first.  The team competed at the 2011 ISF Junior Women's World Championship in Cape Town, South Africa where they finished first.   The team competed at the 2013 ISF Junior Women's World Championship in Brampton, Ontario where they finished second.

References

External links

U-19 Junior Women's National Training Team

Softball
United States
Softball in the United States